MFV is the IATA code for Accomack County Airport, Virginia, USA.

MFV may also refer to:

 Mandjak language, spoken in Africa (by ISO 639 code)
 Motorised Fishing Vessel